Central Gonja District is one of the seven districts in Savannah Region, Ghana. Originally it was formerly part of the then-larger West Gonja District on 23 December 1988, until the part of the district was split off by a decree of president John Agyekum Kufuor in August 2004 to create Central Gonja District; thus the remaining part has been retained as West Gonja Municipal District (which it was elevated to municipal district assembly status on 27 January 2020). The district assembly is located in the central part of Savannah Region and has Buipe as its capital town.

See also

References 

Districts of the Savannah Region (Ghana)